The 138th Field Artillery Brigade is a field artillery brigade of the United States Army. It is a component of the Kentucky Army National Guard. It is headquartered in Lexington, Kentucky.

History
The brigade was originally organized on 21 January 1839 as the Louisville Legion, it was mustered into federal service on 17 May 1846, as the 1st Regiment of Foot, Kentucky Volunteers. It was redesignated and mustered into federal service on 9 September 1861 as the 5th Kentucky Volunteer Infantry, and fought at Shiloh, Murfeesborough, Chickamauga, Chattanooga, and Atlanta. The unit was recalled up into federal service on 18 June 1916, and sent to Hattiesburg, Mississippi, where it helped build Camp Shelby, that was named for the first Governor of Kentucky.

Converted and redesignated as the 138th Field Artillery Regiment, 38th Infantry Division on 9 October 1917, and demobilized on 8 January 1919 at Camp Taylor, Kentucky. The regiment was again inducted into federal service on 17 January 1941 at Louisville and sent to Camp Shelby, MS. The regiment was broken up on 1 March 1941 and HHB was disbanded. The 1st Battalion was designated as the 138th Field Artillery Battalion. The 2d BN was designated as the 198th Field Artillery Battalion. The HHB 138th Field Artillery Regiment as reconstituted on 25 August 1945, and on 13 May 1946 was redesignated as the HHB 138th Field Artillery Group. On 1 Oct 1959 the 138th Field Artillery Group was moved from Louisville to Lexington, and was redesignated on 1 July 1978 as the HHB, 138th Field Artillery Brigade. 

On 19 April 1968, the 2nd Battalion of the 138th was deployed to South Vietnam to provide fire support to the 101st Airborne Division in northern South Vietnam. On 19 June 1969, their firebase, Firebase Tomahawk, was attacked by the North Vietnamese Army 4th Regiment. The attack was repulsed, with the 138th suffering 9 casualties, and the North Vietnamese suffering 23.

On 2 September 2006 the 138th Field Artillery Brigade was redesignated as the 138th Fires Brigade. On 7 July 2007, Soldiers of the 138th Fires Brigade were mobilized to Fort Sill, OK and deployed in Baghdad (during the War in Iraq), until 27 June 2008.  On 1 September 2012, Soldiers from the brigade mobilized and deployed to Camp Lemmonier, Djibouti. Their task was to provide force protection and emergency response forces for the Combined Joint Task Force - Horn of Africa (CJTF-HOA).

Current Structure 
 138th Field Artillery Brigade (138th FAB), Kentucky Army National Guard
 Headquarters Battery, Kentucky Army National Guard
 3rd Battalion, 116th Field Artillery Regiment (3-116th FAR) (HIMARS) High Mobility Artillery Rocket System, Florida Army National Guard
 2nd Battalion, 138th Field Artillery Regiment (2-138th FAR) (M109 A6), Kentucky Army National Guard
 2nd Battalion, 150th Field Artillery Regiment (2-150th FAR) (M777 A2), Indiana Army National Guard
 1st Battalion, 623rd Field Artillery Regiment (1-623rd FAR) High Mobility Artillery Rocket System (HIMARS), Kentucky Army National Guard
 103rd Brigade Support Battalion (103rd BSB), Kentucky Army National Guard
 138th Signal Company, Kentucky Army National Guard

References

External links 
 Lineage and Honors - 138th Field Artillery Brigade

Field artillery brigades of the United States Army
Military units and formations established in 1839
Military units and formations in Kentucky
Lexington, Kentucky
United States Army National Guard
1839 establishments in Kentucky